Rhys Lloyd may refer to:

 Rhys Lloyd (American football) (born 1982) British American-football player
 Rhys Lloyd, Baron Lloyd of Kilgerran (1907–1991), Welsh Liberal Party politician
 Rhys Lloyd (cyclist), Welsh bicyclist at the 2010 Commonwealth Games in cycling men's team pursuit
 Rhys Lloyd of Bronwydd (17th century) 1632 High Sheriff of Cardiganshire

See also

 Evan Alwyn Rhys Lloyd, of Tynbwlch, Llanddeiniol, Llanrhystyd, Cardigan; the 1948 High Sheriff of Cardiganshire
 Lloyd (disambiguation)
 Rhys (name)